Microvirga lupini  is a  nitrogen-fixing, Gram-negative, aerobic rod-shaped and non-spore-forming  bacteria from the genus of Microvirga.

References

Further reading

External links
Type strain of Microvirga lupini at BacDive -  the Bacterial Diversity Metadatabase

Hyphomicrobiales
Bacteria described in 2012